Francesca Genzo (born 9 September 1993) is an Italian canoeist. She competed in the women's K-1 200 metres and the K-1 500 metres  events at the 2020 Summer Olympics.

References

External links
 

1993 births
Living people
Italian female canoeists
Canoeists at the 2020 Summer Olympics
Olympic canoeists of Italy
ICF Canoe Sprint World Championships medalists in kayak
Canoeists at the 2019 European Games
European Games competitors for Italy
Sportspeople from Trieste
21st-century Italian women